Skyward is a 1980 American made-for-television drama film starring Bette Davis, Howard Hesseman, Marion Ross, Suzy Gilstrap, Clu Gulager and Lisa Whelchel. It was directed by Ron Howard, written by Nancy Sackett and broadcast on NBC on November 20, 1980.

Plot
Bette Davis stars as a flight instructor at an old Texas airport. When a young girl in a wheelchair finds the airport by watching gliders fly, she decides she wants to learn how to fly. Davis teaches her to fly with some special controls adapted for her disability. Howard Hesseman is an aircraft repair service mechanic trying desperately to get an old airplane back in the air. The three, together, put the young girl and the old plane up in the air.

Production
The film was made on location in Rockwall, Texas, with the plot centering on the town's airport.

Director Ron Howard has credited this film as helping to convince studios that he could direct feature films.  Getting General Electric to sponsor the film was a big step, and getting Bette Davis on board was also ambitious.  Howard recalls that Bette Davis was initially concerned about Gilstrap's casting because she had no real acting experience.  Davis referred to Howard to "Mr. Howard" at the beginning of the first day of filming, but he soon became "Ron," and she later highly complimented his work, telling him he could be another William Wyler.

Reception
John J. O'Connor of The New York Times opined that G.E. Theater, "an indefatigable supplier of upbeat dramas," had "clearly found itself another hefty dose of safe inspiration" in this film.  But he did credit the casting of paraplegic teenager Suzy Gilstrap in the lead role, as well as the casting of Bette Davis and Howard Hesseman.  Tom Shales of The Washington Post called the movie "one sweet piece of work" and a "lyrical heartwarmer."

The movie was the 16th ranked prime time television show in the United States for the week of its release, with a 22.0 Nielsen rating.

The movie's success led to a one-hour Christmas special directed by Vincent McEveety in December 1981 called Skyward Christmas.  Though Gilstrap reprised her role as Julie, the cast was largely new and the production generally received poor reviews.

Cast 
Bette Davis as Billie Dupree
Howard Hesseman as Koup Trenton
Marion Ross as Natalie Ward 
Clu Gulager as Steve Ward
Ben Marley as Scott Billings
Lisa Whelchel as Lisa Ward
Suzy Gilstrap as Julie Ward
Irma P. Hall as Mrs. Sinclair 
Mark Wheeler as Mr. Olsen
Jessie Lee Fulton as Secretary 
Bill Thurman as Pilot #1
Rance Howard as Pilot #2
Rhonda Minton as Stephanie
Gene Pietragallo as Jason
Greta Blackburn as Miss Russell
Jeff Nicholson as Theatre Usher
Kate Finlayson as Nurse
Rusty McCaskey as Boy in Class
Bill Blackwood as himself
Charley French as Boy in Class

References

External links 
 

1980 television films
1980 films
1980 drama films
American drama television films
1980s English-language films
Films directed by Ron Howard
Films scored by Lee Holdridge
NBC network original films
Films shot in Dallas
Films about disability
Films about paraplegics or quadriplegics
1980s American films